John McDowell Torbet (25 September 1903 – 16 February 1957) was a Scottish professional footballer who played as an outside left.

Born in Benwhat, Dalmellington, Ayrshire, he signed for Partick Thistle from Cumnock Juniors in 1924, and went on to become the club's sixth-highest scorer of all time, scoring 116 goals in all competitions. During his nine-year spell at Firhill he played in the 1930 Scottish Cup Final (scoring his side's goal in a 2-1 replay defeat to Rangers), and was selected for the Glasgow FA annual challenge match against Sheffield three times.

Torbet then moved to England, playing for Preston North End in 1933 before moving to Burton Town and Stockport County, then returned to Scotland with Ayr United, followed by brief spells with Alloa Athletic and Leith Athletic. After retiring as a player, he became the Heart of Midlothian trainer in April 1946 until 1952.

References

External links
 Jack Tarbatt, 1937-38, ScottishLeague.net, June 2007

1903 births
1957 deaths
Footballers from East Ayrshire
Scottish footballers
Association football outside forwards
Scottish Junior Football Association players
Cumnock Juniors F.C. players
Partick Thistle F.C. players
Ayr United F.C. players
Alloa Athletic F.C. players
Leith Athletic F.C. players
Burton Town F.C. players
Preston North End F.C. players
Stockport County F.C. players
Heart of Midlothian F.C. non-playing staff
Scottish Football League players
English Football League players